The Islamic Movement of Central Asia (IMCA) is an Islamist organization affiliated with Al Qaeda, headed by Tohir Yo‘ldosh, that has operated in Central Asia since its formation on 16 September 2002. Its objective is to create a pan-Central Asian Islamist theocracy.

IMCA members include Kyrgyz, Tajik, Uzbek, Chechen, and Uyghur militants.

Kyrgyz Defense Minister Esen Topoyev said there were several hundred Islamic militants and terrorist bases in Badakhshan Province, Afghanistan, and 1,500 terrorists in Paktia Province, as recently as September 2002.

Yo‘ldosh is also the leader of the Islamic Movement of Uzbekistan, the Uzbek division of the IMCA.

See also
Terrorism in Kazakhstan
Islamic Movement of Tajikistan
Islamic Movement of Uzbekistan

References

Terrorism in Central Asia
Islamist groups
Jihadist groups